was a  after Kōan and before Einin. This period spanned the years from April 1288 through August 1293.

Change of era
 1288 : The new era name was created to mark an event or a number of events. The previous era ended and a new one commenced in Kōan 11.

Events of the Shōō era
 April 16, 1288 (Shōō 1, 15th day of the 3rd month): The accession of Emperor Fushimi took place.
 1288 (Shōō 1): Oracles  of the three deities — Amaterasu, Hachiman and Kasuga appeared on the surface of the pond at Todaiji in Nara.
 May 26, 1293 (Shōō 6, 13th day of the 4th month): An earthquake in Kamakura, Japan kills an estimated 23,000.

Notes

References
 Nussbaum, Louis-Frédéric and Käthe Roth. (2005).  Japan encyclopedia. Cambridge: Harvard University Press. ;  OCLC 58053128
 Titsingh, Isaac. (1834). Nihon Odai Ichiran; ou,  Annales des empereurs du Japon.  Paris: Royal Asiatic Society, Oriental Translation Fund of Great Britain and Ireland. OCLC 5850691
 Varley, H. Paul. (1980). A Chronicle of Gods and Sovereigns: Jinnō Shōtōki of Kitabatake Chikafusa. New York: Columbia University Press. ;  OCLC 6042764

External links
 National Diet Library, "The Japanese Calendar" -- historical overview plus illustrative images from library's collection

Japanese eras
1280s in Japan
1290s in Japan